Charlotte's Web is a 1973 American animated musical drama film based on the 1952 children's book of the same name by E. B. White. The film was produced by Hanna-Barbera Productions and distributed by Paramount Pictures. Like the book, this film centers on a pig named Wilbur who befriends an intelligent spider named Charlotte who saves him from being slaughtered.

Directed by Charles A. Nichols and Iwao Takamoto from a story by Earl Hamner Jr., it stars the voices of Debbie Reynolds, Paul Lynde and Henry Gibson, alongside narration by Rex Allen. Charlotte's Web features a score of music and lyrics written by the Sherman Brothers, who had previously written music for family films like Mary Poppins in 1964, The Jungle Book in 1967 and Chitty Chitty Bang Bang in 1968.

Charlotte's Web premiered at the Radio City Music Hall on February 22, 1973, and was released on March 1 to moderate critical and commercial success. This was the first of only four Hanna-Barbera films not to be based upon one of their famous television cartoons, the other three being C.H.O.M.P.S. in 1979, Heidi's Song in 1982 and Once Upon a Forest in 1993.

Plot

Early one morning, Fern Arable prevents her father John from slaughtering a piglet as the runt of the litter. Deciding to let Fern deal with nurturing the piglet, John allows Fern to raise it as a pet. She nurtures it lovingly, naming it Wilbur. Six weeks later, Wilbur, due to being a spring pig, has matured, and John tells Fern that Wilbur has to be sold (his siblings were already sold). Fern sadly says good-bye to Wilbur as he is sold down the street to her uncle, Homer Zuckerman. At Homer's farm, a goose coaxes a sullen Wilbur to speak his first words. Although delighted at this new ability, Wilbur still yearns for companionship. He attempts to get the goose to play with him, but she declines on the condition that she has to hatch her eggs. Wilbur also tries asking a rat named Templeton to play with him, but Templeton's only interests are spying, hiding, and eating. Wilbur then wants to play with a lamb, but the lamb's father says sheep do not play with pigs because it is only a matter of time before pigs are slaughtered and turned into smoked bacon and ham. Horrified at this depressing discovery, Wilbur reduces himself to tears until a mysterious voice tells him to "chin up", and waits until morning to reveal herself to him. The following morning, she reveals herself to be a spider named Charlotte A. Cavatica, living on a web on a corner of Homer's barn overlooking Wilbur's pig pen. She tells him that she will come up with a plan guaranteed to spare his life.

Later, the goose's goslings hatch. One of them, named Jeffrey, befriends Wilbur. Eventually, Charlotte reveals her plan to "play a trick on Zuckerman", and consoles Wilbur to sleep. Fern and Avery visit the barn that same day. Avery tries to capture Charlotte, but is foiled by the stench of a rotten egg. The next morning, Homer's farmhand, Lurvy, sees the words, SOME PIG, spun within Charlotte's web. The incident attracts publicity among Homer's neighbors who deem the praise to be a miracle. The publicity eventually dies down, and, after a hornet lands in Charlotte's web and ruins the SOME PIG message, Charlotte requests the barn animals to devise a new word to spin within her web. After several suggestions, the goose suggests the phrase, TERRIFIC! TERRIFIC! TERRIFIC!, though Charlotte decides to shorten it to one TERRIFIC. The incident becomes another media sensation, though Homer still desires to slaughter Wilbur. For the next message, Charlotte then employs Templeton to pull a word from a magazine clipping at the dump for inspiration, in which he returns the word RADIANT ripped from a soap box to spin within her web. Following this, Homer decides to enter Wilbur in the county fair for the summer. Charlotte reluctantly decides to accompany him, though Templeton at first has no interest in doing so until the goose tells him about all the food there. After one night there, Charlotte sends Templeton to the trash pile on another errand to gather another word for her next message, in which he returns with the word, HUMBLE. The next morning, Wilbur awakens to find Charlotte has spun an egg sac containing her unborn offspring, and the following afternoon, the word, HUMBLE, is spun. However, Fern's brother, Avery, discovers another pig named Uncle has won first place, though the county fair staff decides to hold a celebration in honor of Homer's miraculous pig, and rewards him $25 and an engraved, bronze medal. He then announces that he will allow Wilbur to "live to a ripe old age".

Exhausted from laying eggs and writing words, Charlotte tells Wilbur she will remain at the fair to die. Not willing to let her children be abandoned, Wilbur has Templeton retrieve her egg sac to take back to the farm, just before she dies. Once he returns to Homer's farm, he guards the egg sac through the winter. The next spring, Charlotte's 514 children are hatched, but leave the farm, causing Wilbur to become saddened to the point of wanting to run away. Just as he is about to do so, the ram points out that three of them did not fly away. Pleased at finding new friends, he names them Joy, Nellie, and Aranea, but as much as he loves them, they will never replace the memory of Charlotte.

Voice cast
 Henry Gibson as Wilbur, a pig who was almost killed due to being a runt. Over time, however, he grows so much that one would never have known he was once a runt. When he learns of his fate of being slaughtered, Wilbur instantly breaks down into tears, until Charlotte tells him that she will do whatever it takes to save him. Wilbur is a friendly pig, but also prone to anxiety.
 Debbie Reynolds as Charlotte A. Cavatica, a spider who lives on a web in a corner of Homer's barn above Wilbur's pig pen. She is very loving and motherly, as well as assertive and good at leading the barnyard group. She sometimes grows frustrated at Wilbur's anxiety issues. At the end of the film, she dies after laying 514 eggs, but three of them decide to stay with Wilbur.
 Paul Lynde as Templeton, a care-free, gluttonous and egotistical rat who lives at Homer's farm. He helps Charlotte get new ideas for her webs on the condition that he is promised food. At the end of the film, as well as the sequel, he has four bratty children of his own: Henrietta, Lester, Ralphie, and Junior.
 Agnes Moorehead as the Goose, an unnamed goose who is the one that encourages Wilbur to speak for the first time. Her seven goslings later hatch, although there were actually eight eggs (one was rotten). In the sequel, she was named Gwen.
 Don Messick as Jeffrey, a young, undersized gosling whom Wilbur befriends shortly after his birth. He initially lives, eats, and sleeps with Wilbur rather than his mother and siblings. At one point, Avery remarks that he sounds more like a pig than a gosling, which pleases Jeffrey. When Wilbur is loaded into a crate destined for the fair, Jeffrey casually walks in to join him, amusing the humans but they still remove and restrain him nevertheless. International VHS releases show a deleted scene in which Jeffrey is briefly seen riding with Avery in the back of the Arables' truck, until it stops so Avery can set him down in the middle of the road. Distressed at being separated from Wilbur, Jeffrey tries to catch up with the truck to no avail, leaving him heartbroken. His mother gently directs him to the pond to join his siblings. Despite his previous insistence that they be friends forever, Jeffrey does not reunite with Wilbur when the latter returns from the fair nor does he appear in the rest of the film.
 Messick also voices several other characters, including: Uncle the Pig (impersonating Candy Candido), a county fair pig who wins the first prize; and a Lamb.
 Herb Vigran as Lurvy, Homer's farmhand who is the first to notice the messages in Charlotte's webs.
 Pamelyn Ferdin as Fern Arable, John's daughter who convinces him to spare Wilbur's life.
 Martha Scott as Mrs. Arable, Fern's mother who first tells her of what was going to happen to Wilbur.
 Bob Holt as Homer Zuckerman, Mrs. Arable's brother and Fern's uncle.
 John Stephenson as John Arable, Fern's father. He was about to "do away" with Wilbur until she intervened.
 Danny Bonaduce as Avery Arable, Fern's older brother.
 William B. White as Henry Fussy, a boy of about Fern's age, whom she soon starts spending time with while Wilbur is at the fair.
 Dave Madden as the Ram, one of the first animals Wilbur meets at Homer's farm. He is the first to tell Wilbur that it is a pig's fate to be slaughtered and turned into smoked bacon and ham. Madden also voiced other characters in the film.
 Joan Gerber as Edith Zuckerman, Homer's wife. She comes up with the idea of giving Wilbur a buttermilk bath.
 Gerber also voices Mrs. Fussy, Henry's stern mother who never lets him have fun.
 Rex Allen as the Narrator

Production
In 1967, animators John and Faith Hubley were interested in purchasing the film rights of Charlotte's Web in hopes of producing a feature-length animated adaptation. E. B. White, who had liked the Hubleys, sold the film rights, but the Hubleys were unable to acquire financial backing and the project languished. In September 1970, the Los Angeles Times reported that White had sold the film rights to Charlotte's Web to Edgar Bronfman Sr.'s Sagittarius Productions, which intended to produce a feature-length animated adaptation of the book. Director-producer Michael Campus was hired to supervise the project. Later, in November, Henry White, president of Sagittarius Pictures, and Campus approached director Gene Deitch to direct Charlotte's Web. Deitch agreed and personally met with E.B. White to discuss how the book should be adapted. As part of the contract deal with E.B. White, he would have the final approval of the character design and the casting of the spider character, Charlotte. However, Campus left the project to direct Z.P.G. (1972), and Deitch later learned he was forbidden to show his storyboards to E.B. White.

Development on the film still continued at Deitch's animation studio in Prague with Czech painter Mirko Hanák producing artwork of the film before dying of leukemia in November 1971. However, Bronfman Sr. began to grow dissatisfied with the European-influenced conceptual artwork. By May 1971, Deitch shipped his storyboards in a package to Sagittarius Productions in New York City, which notified him that his package had gone unopened and would be returned to him. On June 3, 1971, Deitch, in a mailed letter to E.B. White, stated that Sagittarius had refused to look his storyboards following six months of work on the project. That same month, it was reported that Sagittarius Productions had signed a two-picture production deal with Hanna-Barbera Productions in which both films would be distributed by Paramount Pictures, one of the films being Charlotte's Web. Around that same time, Joe Barbera had visited White at his residence in Maine, and the author had highlighted parts of the book he did not want to change, and parts that were "subject to discussion."

Casting
In January 1972, it was reported that Henry Gibson, Debbie Reynolds, and Tony Randall had signed on to provide the voices of Wilbur, Charlotte, and Templeton. Writing in his autobiography, Barbera wrote that Reynolds had called him and said that she was willing to join the project even without being paid. Although Randall had completed all of his voicework, co-director Iwao Takamoto wrote that "his readings just went flat, which surprised all of us. Tony's delivery was a bit too sophisticated and his singing was too operatic. He did not have enough of that raunchy feeling that the character required." Barbera felt Randall had to be replaced, and approached Paul Lynde, who was voicing characters in The Perils of Penelope Pitstop and other Hanna-Barbera TV shows at the time, to do a reading. Lynde was officially cast in the following spring, which was followed by Agnes Moorehead, Rex Allen, Pamelyn Ferdin, and Martha Scott who had joined the cast.

Release
Charlotte's Web was originally slated to be released during the summer of 1972, but by September 1972, its release was pushed back to early 1973. The film premiered at the Radio City Music Hall on February 22, 1973, which was followed with its general release on March 1, 1973, by Paramount Pictures in the United States. The film was accompanied in theaters by the animated short The Headless Horseman of Sleepy Hollow. It was also released in West Germany on March 30, 1973, as well as August 11 in Sweden, August 25 in Japan, and September 4, 1981, in Australia.

The film was first released on VHS in 1979, followed by three more re-releases in 1988, 1993, and 1996. It made its DVD debut on June 19, 2001. A second DVD release of the film was released in 2006.

Reception
Vincent Canby of The New York Times described the music and visuals as "exceedingly uninteresting," but noted that the screenplay "has followed the original so closely that it's still possible to be moved by the story." Variety called the film "heartwarming entertainment" with "imaginative and clever" animation. Gene Siskel of the Chicago Tribune gave the film three stars out of four, writing that although "the animation style is television-quickie (bland, static backgrounds), White's story is so blessed nice it is doubtful that anyone or anything could ruin it." Charles Champlin of the Los Angeles Times wrote, "No one, I think, could ask for a more respectful treatment of a classic ... The grownups will miss some of the artful appeal the book has, but can settle gladly enough for a cheerful and enthusiastic piece of children's fare." In a negative review for The Monthly Film Bulletin, Clyde Jeavons criticized the animation as "stiff, basic and two-dimensional" and the music as lacking "that instant catchiness which has always been a successful feature of Walt Disney's cartoon melodies. But the saddest thing of all is to see E. B. White's celebrated fantasy reduced to such plodding blandness in defiance of its rich potential."

The critical consensus reads; "That's some pig, with spirited vocal performances and a charmingly family-friendly adaptation of E.B. White's winsome story spun around him." Among retrospective reviews, Craig Butler of All-Movie Guide criticized the animation and the musical score, but called it a faithful adaptation, noting that "no attempt has been made to soften the existential sadness at the story's core". Dan Jardine criticized the songs and the "Saturday morning cartoon quality" of the animation, but also says that Hamner "retains just enough of White’s elegant prose in the dialogue and narration to keep the film from being simply a painfully well-intended experiment." Christopher Null of Filmcritic.com stated that the animation is sometimes "downright bad", but that White's classic fable needs little to make it come to life. TV Guide reviewed the film with generally positive remarks, stating that "The voices of Reynolds, Lynde, Gibson, and all the rest are perfectly cast, and the songs by the Sherman brothers are solid, although none of them became hits like those they wrote for such Disney movies as MARY POPPINS." When it was reissued on DVD it was awarded an Oppenheim Toy Portfolio Gold Award.

E.B. White's reaction
Despite assisting in helping keep parts of the story, White was still very displeased with the adaptation. According to Gene Deitch, White wrote him in a 1977 letter, "We have never ceased to regret that your version of 'Charlotte's Web' never got made. The Hanna-Barbera version has never pleased either of us ... a travesty ..." White himself wrote of the film, "The story is interrupted every few minutes so that somebody can sing a jolly song. I don't care much for jolly songs. The Blue Hill Fair, which I tried to report faithfully in the book, has become a Disney World, with 76 trombones. But that's what you get for getting embroiled in Hollywood." White had previously turned down Disney when they offered to make a film based on his book. According to the film's writer, Earl Hamner Jr., Katharine White, White's wife — who sometimes offered advice and suggestions to the filmmakers — would have preferred the music of Mozart in the film, rather than the music of the Sherman Brothers.

Legacy
The film has developed a devoted following over the following years due to television and VHS; in 1994 it surprised the marketplace by becoming one of the best-selling titles of the year, 21 years after its first premiere. No other non-Disney musical animated film has enjoyed such a comeback in popularity, prompting a direct-to-video sequel, Charlotte's Web 2: Wilbur's Great Adventure, which Paramount released in the US on March 18, 2003 (Universal released it internationally and, through Universal Cartoon Studios, also animated it), followed by a live-action film version (co-produced by Nickelodeon Movies) of the original story, which was released on December 15, 2006.

Debbie Reynolds has stated that in her later appearances, when fans handed her items to autograph. most of them were soundtrack albums of Charlote's Web.

Gary Wince, director of the 2006 CG remake of Charlotte's Web, said on the DVD commentary that the fair sequence had to be lengthened after test audiences commented that Templeton's "Smorgasbord" song was missing, referring to one of the memorable sequences in the 1973 film.

The film is recognized by American Film Institute in these lists:
 2008: AFI's 10 Top 10:
 Nominated Animation Film

Sequel

A direct-to-video sequel titled Charlotte's Web 2: Wilbur's Great Adventure was released in 2003, co-produced by Nickelodeon and co-distributed by Universal Studios Home Entertainment. The sequel centers on Wilbur's relationship with a lonely lamb named Cardigan and also shows Charlotte's children as adolescents. Reviews for the sequel were generally unfavorable, with critics panning its animation and plot.

Music

The soundtrack was composed by the Sherman Brothers, who are well known for their work on numerous Disney films. Al Sherman, songwriting father of the Sherman Brothers, considered it their finest score.

"Zuckerman's Famous Pig" is the title that saves Wilbur from being slaughtered in the story. It was the theme of the finale song in the film. It was written by the Sherman Brothers and arranged as a barbershop quartet by Irwin Kostal, in keeping with the time and place of the story. It was covered by the Brady Kids and was chosen for release on their first single taken from The Brady Bunch Phonographic Album by producer Jackie Mills on Paramount Records. The group also recorded the theme from Charlotte's Web, as did Ray Conniff for Columbia Records.

Songs
Original songs performed in the film include:

1973 Soundtrack Album and 2018 CD Reissue
The original soundtrack album was released in 1973 on Paramount Records, with a picture disc in 1978 on MCA Records, which bought the Paramount label. In March 2018 the Original Cast Soundtrack was released on CD for the first time by the Varèse Sarabande record label, followed by a vinyl reissue a few months later.

See also

 List of American films of 1973
 List of works produced by Hanna-Barbera Productions

References

External links

 
 
 
 
 
 

1973 animated films
1973 films
1970s American animated films
1970s fantasy films
1970s musical drama films
Adaptations of works by E. B. White
American children's animated drama films
American children's animated fantasy films
American children's animated musical films
American musical fantasy films
Animated films about pigs
Animated films about friendship
1970s English-language films
Films about spiders
Animated films based on American novels
Animated films based on children's books
Hanna-Barbera animated films
Musicals by the Sherman Brothers
Paramount Pictures animated films
Paramount Pictures films
Films directed by Charles August Nichols
Films directed by Iwao Takamoto
1970s children's animated films
Films scored by Irwin Kostal
Films set on farms
Films based on novels by E. B. White
Animated films about rats
1973 drama films